In aviation safety, master minimum equipment list, or MMEL, is a categorized list of on-board systems, instruments and equipment that may be inoperative for flight in a specified aircraft model. Procedures or conditions may be associated with items on the list. Any airworthiness-related equipment or system not on the list must be functional for flight.

Overview
Under the provisions of Article 41 of the ANO 2009 no aircraft registered in the United Kingdom may commence a flight if any of the equipment required by or under the Order is not carried or is not in a fit condition for use, unless a Permission to do so has been issued by the CAA. Similarly, EU-OPS 1.030/JAR-OPS 3.030 states that an operator shall establish for each aeroplane, an MEL approved by the CAA that will be based upon the relevant MMEL accepted by the CAA. In addition, an operator shall not operate an aeroplane other than in accordance with the MEL unless permitted by the CAA. 

MEL (Minimum Equipment List):
MEL is based upon the MMEL (Master Minimum Equipment List). MMEL is defined on a per aircraft model basis. MEL is prepared by the operator by taking reference of the MMEL keeping in mind the type and number of equipment installed. Initial issue of the MEL and its subsequent revisions will be approved by competent authority. 

The philosophy behind MEL is to authorize release of flight with inoperative equipment only when the inoperative equipment does not render the aircraft unairworthy for the particular flight to avoid revenue loss to the operator and discomfort to the passengers. 

Limitations, procedures and substitutions may be used to provide conditions under which the inoperative equipment will not make the operation unsafe or the aircraft unairworthy. This is not a philosophy which permits reduced safety in order to fly to a base where repairs can be made, but rather a philosophy which permits safe operations for a take off from a maintenance base or en-route stop. It may not include items like galley equipment, entertainment systems, passenger convenience equipment, which do not affect the airworthiness of an aircraft. All items which affect the airworthiness of aircraft or safety of those carried on board and are not included in MEL are required to be operative.

Implementation
Minimum equipment lists are issued to specific aircraft and specific operators. In order to use a minimum equipment list, that specific company must receive a letter of authorization from the civil aviation authorities of the countries where the aircraft will operate.

A minimum equipment list is required in the United States by the Federal Aviation Administration:
When operating any turbine-powered aircraft such as jets or turboprops.
When operating under part 135 (Commuter and on-demand operations)
When operating under part 125 (Non-airline large aircraft operations)

The same kind of regulation is also enforced by its regulatory counterpart in other nations, such as the European Aviation Safety Agency, the FAA European counterpart

References

External links
 
Aircraft maintenance
Aviation publications
Aircraft operations